Benzodioxolefentanyl is an opioid analgesic that is an analog of fentanyl and has been sold as a designer drug.

Side effects 
Side effects of fentanyl analogs are similar to those of fentanyl itself, which include itching, nausea and potentially serious respiratory depression, which can be life-threatening. Fentanyl analogs have killed hundreds of people throughout Europe and the former Soviet republics since the most recent resurgence in use began in Estonia in the early 2000s, and novel derivatives continue to appear. A new wave of fentanyl analogues and associated deaths began in around 2014 in the US, and have continued to grow in prevalence; especially since 2016 these drugs have been responsible for hundreds of overdose deaths every week.

Legal status 
In the United States, fentanyl-related substances are Schedule I controlled substances.  Benzodioxolefentanyl was banned in Sweden in July 2017, and in Finland in September 2017.

See also 
 Furanylfentanyl
 Cyclopentylfentanyl
 List of fentanyl analogues

References 

Anilides
Designer drugs
Mu-opioid receptor agonists
Piperidines
Synthetic opioids